Alejandro González Yáñez (born 9 September 1956) is a Mexican politician affiliated with the Labor Party who will serve as a senator from the state of Durango in the LXIV Legislature of the Mexican Congress. He also was a senator in the LX and LXI Legislatures and a federal deputy during the LIX Legislature.

References

External links
 Legislatura del Congreso de la Unión de México

1956 births
Living people
Politicians from Mexico City
Members of the Senate of the Republic (Mexico)
Members of the Chamber of Deputies (Mexico)
Labor Party (Mexico) politicians
20th-century Mexican politicians
21st-century Mexican politicians
National Autonomous University of Mexico alumni
Academic staff of Universidad Juárez del Estado de Durango
Members of the Congress of Durango